Varennes is an off-island suburb of Montreal, in southwestern Quebec, Canada, on the Saint Lawrence River in the Marguerite-D'Youville Regional County Municipality. The population as of the Canada 2011 Census was 20,994. In 2015, the population is listed at 24,000.

History

The history of Varennes starts with the arrival of the Régiment de Carignan-Salières in New France. René Gaultier, sieur de Varennes, was given three concessions by intendant Jean Talon in 1672, le Tremblay, la Gabelle and Varennes. Jaques-René, one of his sons, was the second seigneur of Varennes. Five seignories later composed the Varennes parish. They were the seignories du Cap de Varennes, de l'île Sainte Thérese, de Grand Maison, du Cap de la trinité and du Cap Saint-Michel. The town was captured by the British in 1760 during the Montreal Campaign. It was part of the Province of Quebec (1763–1791), then of Lower Canada, before it returned to being part of Quebec again in 1867 due to Canadian Confederation.

Varennes gained the status of city in 1972.

Demographics 

Prominent citizens

 Gilles Courteau
 Christophe-Alphonse Geoffrion
 Félix Geoffrion
 Marc-Amable Girard
 Sylvain Grenier

 Marie-Mai
 Louis Massue
 Philippe-François de Rastel de Rocheblave
 Théodore Robitaille
 Louis-Adélard Sénécal
 Marie-Marguerite d'Youville

See also
Marguerite-D'Youville Regional County Municipality
Saint Lawrence River
Saint-Charles River (Varennes)
List of cities in Quebec

References

External links
 Official website

 
Cities and towns in Quebec
Quebec populated places on the Saint Lawrence River
1672 establishments in the French colonial empire
Incorporated places in Marguerite-D'Youville Regional County Municipality
Canada geography articles needing translation from French Wikipedia